Jesus Santiago Moure (born 2 November 1912 in Ribeirão Preto, died on 10 July 2010 in Batatais) was a Brazilian entomologist who specialised in Hymenoptera.

References

External links
 Moure's Bee Catalogue
 Biography of Jesus Santiago Moure
 

Brazilian entomologists
People from Ribeirão Preto
1912 births
2010 deaths
Claretians
Recipients of the National Order of Scientific Merit (Brazil)